Woodwardia unigemmata, the jewelled chain fern, is a species of evergreen fern native to Eastern Asia from the Himalayas to China, Japan and the Philippines. It occurs  in areas of high rainfall.

This plant is grown as an ornamental, and in the UK has gained the Royal Horticultural Society’s Award of Garden Merit. However it requires a sheltered position in well-cultivated, reliably moist soil.

References

Blechnaceae
Ferns of Asia
Flora of Asia